Aquarium is a Tetris variant puzzle arcade game released by Excellent System in 1996 in Japan only.  Play consists of matching three fish shapes rows to make them disappear.

External links
Aquarium at Arcade History

1996 video games
Arcade video games
Arcade-only video games
Falling block puzzle games
Japan-exclusive video games
Video game clones
Video games developed in Japan
Video games with underwater settings